The Tuolumne Meadows Ranger Station and Comfort Stations are examples of National Park Service Rustic design in Yosemite National Park.  They are within the Tuolumne Meadows Historic District  at Tuolumne Meadows. The ranger station was built in 1924 using peeled log construction. The ranger station doubled as the park entrance station for the Tioga Road. Its function was partly superseded by a newer structure in 1936, using larger quantities of stonework.

Later structures
Later structures, such as the comfort station or public toilet, was designed by the National Park Service Branch of Plans and Designs and was built by Civilian Conservation Corps labor.

Other structures, including bunk houses and mess halls were built in the Tuolumne Meadows Historic District at the same time to similar design standards. The original CCC mess hall, built in 1934, has become the Tuolumne Meadows Visitor Center.

See also
History of the Yosemite area
National Register of Historic Places listings in Mariposa County, California
Tuolumne Meadows

References

External links
 — at the National Park Service's NRHP database.

National Park Service ranger stations
Restrooms in the United States
Park buildings and structures on the National Register of Historic Places in California
Civilian Conservation Corps in California
Rustic architecture in California
National Register of Historic Places in Mariposa County, California
National Register of Historic Places in Yosemite National Park
1924 establishments in California